This list is of the , the structural geotectonic units, of Japan. The Geological Survey of Japan subdivides the Japanese archipelago into twenty-seven belts, though these are subject to scholarly revision and local variation as to naming. (For instance, the Geological Survey of Japan has the North(ern) Kitakami Belt extending into the Oshima Peninsula and beyond in southwest Hokkaidō, while Isozaki et al. (2010) and Barnes (2013) write of the N(orthern) Kitakami-Oshima Belt, and Takahashi et al. (2016) recognize the North Kitakami Belt and the Oshima Belt; Ueda (2016) treats the "Rebun-Kabato Belt" as a sub-belt of this Oshima Belt (i.e., Rebun-Kabato Sub-belt).)

List of belts
The twenty-seven belts according to the Geological Survey of Japan are as follows:

See also
 Geology of Japan

References

External links
  Map of the Belts of Japan

Geology of Japan